Tetractinellida is an order of sea sponges belonging to the class Demospongiae. First described in 1876, this order received a new description in 2012 and replaced the two orders Astrophorida and Spirophorida, which then became sub-orders as Astrophorina and Spirophorina.

Families
 Suborder Astrophorina Sollas, 1887
 Family Ancorinidae Schmidt, 1870
 Family Calthropellidae Lendenfeld, 1907
 Family Corallistidae Sollas, 1888
 Family Geodiidae Gray, 1867
 Family Isoraphiniidae Schrammen, 1924
 Family Macandrewiidae Schrammen, 1924
 Family Neopeltidae Sollas, 1888
 Family Pachastrellidae Carter, 1875
 Family Phymaraphiniidae Schrammen, 1924
 Family Phymatellidae Schrammen, 1910
 Family Pleromidae Sollas, 1888
 Family Theneidae Carter, 1883
 Family Theonellidae Lendenfeld, 1903
 Family Thrombidae Sollas, 1888
 Family Vulcanellidae Cárdenas, Xavier, Reveillaud, Schander & Rapp, 2011
 Suborder Spirophorina Bergquist & Hogg, 1969
 Family Azoricidae Sollas, 1888
 Family Samidae Sollas, 1888
 Family Scleritodermidae Sollas, 1888
 Family Siphonidiidae Lendenfeld, 1903
 Family Spirasigmidae Hallmann, 1912
 Family Stupendidae Kelly & Cárdenas, 2016
 Family Tetillidae Sollas, 1886
 Suborder Thoosina Carballo, Bautista-Guerrero, Cárdenas, Cruz-Barraza, Aguilar-Camacho, 2018
 Family Thoosidae Cockerell, 1925

References

 
Sponge orders